The 2022 Gibraltar Open (officially the 2022 BetVictor Gibraltar Open) was a professional snooker tournament that took place from 24 to 26 March 2022 at the Europa Point Sports Complex. The 14th ranking event of the 2021–22 snooker season, it followed the Turkish Masters and preceded the Tour Championship. It was the seventh -- and currently final -- edition of the Gibraltar Open, first held in 2015, and the eighth and final event of the 2021–22 European Series. 

The defending champion was Judd Trump, who defeated Jack Lisowski 4–0 in the 2021 final. However, Trump lost 0–4 to Ricky Walden in the last 16. Robert Milkins defeated Kyren Wilson 4–2 in the final to win the first ranking title of his 27-year professional career. Aged 46, Milkins became the oldest first-time winner of a ranking event since Doug Mountjoy won the 1988 UK Championship. 

John Higgins secured the European Series bonus of £150,000, awarded to the player who won the most cumulative prize money over the eight tournaments. Stuart Bingham made the highest break of the tournament, a 147 in the final frame of his first-round match with Gerard Greene. It was the ninth maximum break of Bingham's career and the eighth of the 2021–22 season.

Format
The event was the seventh iteration of the Gibraltar Open, which was first held in 2015. It took place from 24 to 26 March 2022 at the Europa Point Sports Complex in Gibraltar. The 14th ranking tournament of the 2021–22 snooker season, it followed the Turkish Masters and preceded the Tour Championship. The defending champion was Judd Trump, who had defeated Jack Lisowski 4–0 in the 2021 final. The tournament was organised by the World Snooker Tour and sponsored by BetVictor. All matches were contested as the best of seven .

The event saw a significant number of withdrawals, including Mark Williams, Shaun Murphy, Stephen Maguire, Kurt Maflin, Anthony McGill, Sam Craigie, David Gilbert and Anthony Hamilton. Additionally, bad weather in Gibraltar led to a number of flights being diverted to Málaga, where some players travelling on non-British passports did not meet Spanish visa requirements and had to return to the UK.

European Series bonus 
The Gibraltar Open was the concluding event of the 2021–22 European Series, which carried a £150,000 bonus for the player who won the most cumulative prize money over its eight tournaments. Eleven players remained in contention for the bonus at the beginning of the tournament. John Higgins topped the series money list with £98,000; Mark Allen had the same amount, but Higgins led on countback, having gone further in the European Masters than Allen. Fan Zhengyi, Luca Brecel, Neil Robertson and Ronnie O’Sullivan all began the tournament with £90,000 or more. Zhao Xintong, Hossein Vafaei, Joe Perry, Judd Trump and Ricky Walden were also in contention. Vafaei was forced to withdraw from the tournament due to visa issues in Spain. O'Sullivan and Fan lost in the round of 128; Zhao, Perry, and Brecel lost in the round of 64; and Higgins and Allen lost in the round of 32. Trump and Robertson needed to reach the final to remain in contention, but both lost in the round of 16. Walden needed to win the event to capture the bonus, but he lost in the semi-finals. This meant that Higgins remained top of the series prize money list and won the bonus.

Prize fund
The event featured a prize fund of £251,000, of which the winner received £50,000. The breakdown of the tournament's prize money is shown below:

 Winner: £50,000
 Runner-up: £20,000
 Semi-final: £6,000
 Quarter-final: £5,000
 Last 16: £4,000
 Last 32: £3,000
 Last 64: £2,000
 Highest break: £5,000
 Total: £251,000

Tournament draw
Below is the full draw for the event. Players in bold denote match winners.

Top half

Section 1

Section 2

Section 3

Section 4

Bottom half

Section 5

Section 6

Section 7

Section 8

Finals

Final

Century breaks
A total of 70 century breaks were made during the tournament.

 147, 119, 101  Stuart Bingham
 140, 112, 109, 103, 102  Ricky Walden
 139  Zhou Yuelong
 138, 103  Zhang Anda
 135  Noppon Saengkham
 133, 123, 119, 112  Ding Junhui
 132, 117, 114, 114, 101  Jimmy Robertson
 132, 117, 108, 100, 100  Kyren Wilson
 132  James Cahill
 130, 112, 108, 102  Lyu Haotian
 126, 112  John Higgins
 126  Soheil Vahedi
 122  Tom Ford
 122  Jak Jones
 120  Matthew Stevens
 119, 103  Jack Lisowski
 119  Zhao Xintong
 118  Thepchaiya Un-Nooh
 117, 117, 105, 100  Jordan Brown
 116  Jamie Jones
 114, 102, 100  Ben Hancorn
 114  Lee Walker
 113  Dominic Dale
 112, 102  Neil Robertson
 109  Gao Yang
 106  Joe Perry
 105, 104  Mark Allen
 105  David Grace
 104, 101, 100  Yuan Sijun
 104, 100  Ben Woollaston
 104  Louis Heathcote
 104  Mitchell Mann
 103  Luca Brecel
 103  Zhou Yuelong
 102  Ashley Hugill
 102  Robbie Williams
 101  Ross Muir

References

2022
2022 in snooker
2022 in Gibraltarian sport
March 2022 sports events in Europe
European Series